The Devil's Gift is a 1984 horror film directed by Kenneth J. Berton. The film's plot is similar to that of the Stephen King short story "The Monkey", leading some to believe that the filmmakers plagiarized the story.

Plot
An elderly woman, Elmira Johnson, uses a Ouija board to communicate with a dead spirit. When a spirit becomes angry, it manifests itself into a cymbal-banging monkey toy. The monkey's eyes glow red and uses its cymbals to cause lightning to strike the old woman's house, presumably killing her.

Some time later, David Andrews, a suburban single father, celebrates his young son Michael's ninth birthday. The child receives the monkey from David's girlfriend Susan, who purchased it at an antiques store. The monkey strikes its cymbals on its own accord. Soon after the party, David awakens screaming from a nightmare in which he found Michael dead in the bathtub. After the household plants die, and the family's dog mysteriously dies from smoke inhalation after a fire in their garage, David suspects the monkey of being behind the events.

David hires Adrienne, a fortune teller, to perform an exorcism on his home, but does not inform her about the monkey. Adrienne asks him if he has any statues or idols, explaining that demons often possess objects that are seemingly harmless, but use them as an outlet for their satanic activity. David realizes that the monkey is such an item, and is certain that a demon is in their home. He wants Adrienne to come and do an exorcism immediately. She tells him that she would need to find out more about his situation before she can intervene. She tells him that if it is a demon, she may not be able to help.

David returns to the antiques store and the clerk tells him an odd man brought it to the store the previous week after finding it in the ruins of the old woman's house; the monkey showed no signs of fire damage, causing the clerk to disbelieve the story. Despite this, the clerk tells David about Elmira Johnson's recent death by fire. David doesn't think anything of this. When he arrives home, he finds that Susan has become possessed by the monkey and is trying to drown Michael in the bathtub. He grabs Susan and throws her out of his home, which causes her to sustain a head injury. A neighbor witnesses the incident and calls an ambulance.

David decides to tell Adrienne about the monkey. She tells him she may be able to help. However, she tells him that when a demon is in contact with one who can see into the future and talk to ghosts, it goes crazy, and that "all hell would break loose" if she set foot in his home. She gives him a special necklace that will protect him from the demon as long as he keeps it in on him at all times. She tells him that he must get rid of the monkey immediately. The boy's father throws the monkey away, but his son quickly rescues it from the garbage and brings it back inside the house. Moments afterwards, Michael is almost hit by a car while playing in the driveway. David then takes the monkey and attempts to bury it but it finds its way into the house again thanks to his mother. The monkey then winds up causing the violent deaths of the boy and his family by blowing up the house from inside.

Merlin's Shop of Mystical Wonders 
In 1996, Berton re-edited the film as the second story of Merlin's Shop of Mystical Wonders, a horror/fantasy anthology film aimed at children (unlike the adult-rated original film). In addition to removing the more violent sequences of the original, other subplots are missing and Adrienne only appears in a single scene.  The entire plotline in which Susan is possessed by the demon is missing, leading to her suddenly vanishing from the film. The Merlin version also integrates that film's framing device, showing Merlin trying to track down the toy monkey (an artifact stolen from his shop) in several interludes. This also leads to the addition of a happy ending in which Merlin arrives at the last moment and stops the monkey from blowing up the house. Dubbing added in the production of that film confirms the survival of the family in this version.

See also
 Killer toy

References

External links

1984 films
1984 horror films
Films involved in plagiarism controversies
1980s English-language films